Armando Silega (born October 26, 1962) is a Cuban sprint canoer who competed in the early 1990s. At the 1992 Summer Olympics in Barcelona, he was eliminated in the semifinals of both the C-1 500 m and the C-1 1000 m events.

References
Sports-Reference.com profile

1970 births
Canoeists at the 1992 Summer Olympics
Cuban male canoeists
Living people
Olympic canoeists of Cuba
Pan American Games medalists in canoeing
Pan American Games gold medalists for Cuba
Pan American Games silver medalists for Cuba
Canoeists at the 1987 Pan American Games
Canoeists at the 1991 Pan American Games
Medalists at the 1987 Pan American Games
Medalists at the 1991 Pan American Games
21st-century Cuban people
20th-century Cuban people